The president (speaker) of the Storting is the presiding officer of the Storting legislature of Norway. The position was created in 1814, when the country received its constitution.

List of presidents of the Norwegian Parliament
Below is a list of the Storting's office-holders:

References

Sources
 Rulers.org

Politics of Norway

Norway, Storting
Storting